Sarkidiornis is a genus within the family Anatidae. Sarkidiornis is sometimes considered a monotypic genus with its sole member the knob-billed duck (S. melanotos), a cosmopolitan species. Most taxonomic authorities, however, split the species into two:

References

 https://www.itis.gov/servlet/SingleRpt/SingleRpt?search_topic=TSN&search_value=175243#null ITIS reference

 
Taxa named by Thomas Campbell Eyton